Monica De Gennaro (born 8 January 1987) is an Italian professional volleyball player. She plays for Imoco Volley Conegliano and for the Italy women's national volleyball team. She competed at the 2012 Summer Olympics and 2016 Summer Olympics.

Career
De Gennaro played with her national team at the 2014 World Championship. There her team ended up in fourth place after losing 2–3 to Brazil the bronze medal match. She was selected to be tournament's Best Libero.

De Gennaro won the 2020–21 CEV Women's Champions League and was twice a runner-up with Imoco Volley Conegliano (2016-17 and 2018-19), receiving the award of Best Libero in those three editions of the Champions League.

She won both the 2019 FIVB Club World Championship and the Best Libero award in China.

She won the 2017 FIVB World Grand Prix silver medal and the Best Libero individual award.

At the 2014 FIVB World Championship she won the Best Libero award, ant at the 2018 FIVB World Championship in Japan, she won the silver medal and the Best Libero individual award.

She won the 2021 Women's European Volleyball Championship and the Best Libero individual award.

Awards

Individuals
 2006-07 Italian League "Best Receiver"
 2006-07 Italian League "Best Under 20 Serie A1 player"
 2007–08 CEV Challenge Cup "Best Receiver"
 2013 Montreux Volley Masters "Best Receiver"
 2014 FIVB World Championship "Best Libero"
 2016-17 CEV Champions League "Best Libero"
 2016-17 Italian Cup (Coppa Italia) "MVP"
 2017 World Grand Prix "Best Libero"
 2018 FIVB World Championship "Best Libero"
 2018–19 Italian League "MVP"
 2020–21 CEV Women's Champions League "Best Libero"
 2021 Women's European Volleyball Championship "Best Libero"
 2021 FIVB Volleyball Women's Club World Championship "Best Libero"
2022 FIVB Nations League – "Best Libero"

Clubs
 2010 Italian Supercup -  Champions, with Scavolini Pesaro
 2013 Italian Supercup -  Runner-Up, with Imoco Volley Conegliano
 2015–16 Italian League -  Champion, with Imoco Volley Conegliano
 2016 Italian Supercup -  Champions, with Imoco Volley Conegliano
 2016-17 Italian Cup (Coppa Italia) -  Champions, with Imoco Volley Conegliano
 2016–17 CEV Champions League -  Runner-Up, with Imoco Volley Conegliano
 2017–18 Italian League -  Champion, with Imoco Volley Conegliano
 2018 Italian Supercup -  Champions, with Imoco Volley Conegliano
 2018–19 Italian League -  Champion, with Imoco Volley Conegliano
 2018–19 CEV Champions League -  Runner-Up, with Imoco Volley Conegliano
 2019 Italian Supercup -  Champions, with Imoco Volley Conegliano
 2019 FIVB Volleyball Women's Club World Championship -  Champion, with Imoco Volley Conegliano
 2019-20 Italian Cup (Coppa Italia) -  Champion, with Imoco Volley Conegliano
 2020 Italian Supercup -  Champions, with Imoco Volley Conegliano
 2020-21 Italian Cup (Coppa Italia) -  Champion, with Imoco Volley Conegliano
 2020–21 Italian League -  Champion, with Imoco Volley Conegliano
 2020–21 CEV Women's Champions League -  Champion, with Imoco Volley Conegliano
 2021 Italian Supercup -  Champions, with Imoco Volley Conegliano
 2021 FIVB Volleyball Women's Club World Championship -  Runner-Up, with Imoco Volley Conegliano
 2021-22 Italian Cup (Coppa Italia) -  Champion, with Imoco Volley Conegliano
 2021–22 Italian League -  Champion, with Imoco Volley Conegliano

References

1987 births
Living people
Competitors at the 2013 Mediterranean Games
Italian women's volleyball players
Mediterranean Games gold medalists for Italy
Mediterranean Games medalists in volleyball
Olympic volleyball players of Italy
Sportspeople from the Province of Naples
Volleyball players at the 2012 Summer Olympics
Volleyball players at the 2016 Summer Olympics
Volleyball players at the 2020 Summer Olympics
Serie A1 (women's volleyball) players